Ágnes Herczegh (born 28 August 1950 in Csorna, Győr-Moson-Sopron) is a retired female discus thrower, who competed for Hungary at the 1980 Summer Olympics. She set her personal best (65.22 metres) in 1982.

References
sports-reference

1950 births
Living people
Hungarian female discus throwers
Athletes (track and field) at the 1980 Summer Olympics
Olympic athletes of Hungary